Mellow may refer to:

 Mellow (Maria Mena album), 2004
 Mellow (Donovan album), 1997 
 Mellow (Sonny Stitt album), 1975 
 Mellow (Houston Person album), 2010
 Mellow (band)
 "Mellow", a song by Elton John from his 1972 album Honky Château
 Mellow (British Rapper)

Mellow is a surname. Notable people with the surname include:

Bob Mellow (born 1942), American politician
Gail Mellow (born 1952), American social psychologist
James R. Mellow (1926–1997), American art critic and biographer
Jerome Mellow (born 1937), Dominican cricketer
Melville de Mellow (1913–1989), Indian radio broadcaster

See also
 Mello (disambiguation)
 Melo (disambiguation)
 Mellow Yellow
 Mellow Yellow (disambiguation)